() is an Israeli television mystery music game show based on South Korean programme I Can See Your Voice. It premiered on Keshet 12 on 28 February 2023.

Gameplay

Format
Presented with a group of six "mystery singers" identified only by their occupation, a guest artist must attempt to eliminate bad singers from the group without ever hearing them sing, assisted by clues and a celebrity panel over the course of four rounds. At the end of the game, the last remaining mystery singer is revealed as either good or bad by means of a duet between them and one of the guest artists.

Rewards
If the singer is good, he/she will have release a digital single; if the singer is bad, he/she wins .

Rounds
Each episode presents the guest artist with six people whose identities and singing voices are kept concealed until they are eliminated to perform on the "stage of truth" or remain in the end to perform the final duet.

Production
Keshet Media Group first announced the development of the series in July 2022, following the successful broadcasts of HaZamar b'Masekha. It is produced by Gil Productions.

Episodes

Guest artists

Reception

Television ratings

Source:

Notes

References

International versions of I Can See Your Voice
2020s Israeli television series
2023 Israeli television series debuts
Channel 12 (Israel) original programming
Hebrew-language television shows
Israeli game shows
Israeli television series based on South Korean television series